In England, parish plans are a form of community-led plan.

Parish plans determine the future of communities and how they can change for the better.  They are documents that set out a vision for the future of a parish and outlines how that can be achieved in an action plan.

The parish plan process may include:

a village appraisal – a household questionnaire to assess needs and aspirations of local people
participatory appraisals – hands-on interactive workshops
business surveys
the creation of an action plan

Members of the rural community action network support groups in local communities to create parish plans.
 
Another type of community-led plan is a village design statement.

See also
 Neighborhood planning
 Rural community council

References 

Town and country planning in England